Trevor Bardette (born Terva Gaston Hubbard; November 19, 1902 – November 28, 1977 ) was an American film and television actor. Among many other roles in his long and prolific career, Bardette appeared in several  episodes of Adventures of Superman and as Newman Haynes Clanton, or Old Man Clanton, in 21 episodes of the ABC/Desilu western series,  The Life and Legend of Wyatt Earp.

Early years
Bardette acted with the dramatic club at Oregon State University, where he graduated in 1925 with a degree in mechanical engineering. He then earned a master of science degree at Northwestern University.

Career

Bardette began working in film in 1936, after leaving a planned mechanical engineering career. His first role was in the 1937 movie Borderland, a Hopalong Cassidy "Old West" feature.

He made over 172 movies and 72 television appearances in his career, and was seen as a rustler, gangster, wartime collaborator. On the Adventures of Superman, he played the sinister title character in the 1951 show The Human Bomb. In its 1954 episode "Great Caesar's Ghost", he was a member of a criminal gang trying to drive editor Perry White insane by making him think the subject of his oft-heard epithet had materialized.  He played "Wally", the proprietor of Wally's Filling Station, in the "Gomer the House Guest" episode of The Andy Griffith Show.

Bardette was cast in various roles in four episodes of the anthology series The Ford Television Theatre between 1953 and 1956. He guest-starred six times each on the original CBS family drama, Lassie, and in Clint Walker's ABC/Warner Brothers western series, Cheyenne. Bardette appeared three times on John Payne's western series, The Restless Gun as well as Wagon Train, and Have Gun – Will Travel. Twice he appeared on Tales of Wells Fargo, Broken Arrow, Gunsmoke, Maverick, Laramie and Trackdown. 

Bardette played Captain Warner in the 1962 episode "A Matter of Honor" on the syndicated western anthology series, Death Valley Days. In that episode, Vic Morrow played Lt. Robert Benson. In Oct 1962 he played Jessie Johnson on an episode of Bonanza, "The Way Station", as the grandfather of a lovestruck young woman whose love interest holds a stage hostage until a posse arrives.  In 1965, he played Stanley Conklin in the episode "The Unborn" of the CBS drama Slattery's People, starring Richard Crenna as a state legislator. 

From 1959 to 1961, he was cast as the unscrupulous Old Man Clanton on The Life and Legend of Wyatt Earp, with Hugh O'Brian in the title role of Wyatt Earp. His last appearance was in "The Requiem for Old Man Clanton" on May 30, 1961. Bardette appeared as well in different roles in five earlier Wyatt Earp episodes between 1956 and 1958. 

Bardette made two guest appearances on CBS's Perry Mason.  In 1959, he played murder victim John Brant in "The Case of the Startled Stallion," and in 1963 he played murderer Garrett Richards in "The Case of the Two-Faced Turn-a-Bout," with Hugh O'Brian in the role of guest attorney Bruce Jason.

Bardette made his final television appearance in the 1968 episode "Goodbye, Dolly" of the CBS sitcom Gomer Pyle, U.S.M.C., starring Jim Nabors. His final film appearance was the next year in Mackenna's Gold.

Selected filmography

 The Cabin in the Cotton (1932) - Bit Part (uncredited)
 Borderland (1937) - Col. Gonzales
 They Won't Forget (1937) - Shattuck Clay
 White Bondage (1937) - Lon Huston (uncredited)
 The Great Garrick (1937) - M. Noverre
 Jezebel (1938) - Sheriff at Plantation (uncredited)
 Topa Topa (1938) - Joe Morton
 Mystery House (1938) - Bruker
 Marie Antoinette (1938) - Municipal Taking the Young Dauphin (uncredited)
 Valley of the Giants (1938) - Complaining Landowner (uncredited)
 In Old Mexico (1938) - Colonel Gonzalez
 Smashing the Spy Ring (1938) - Jordan (uncredited)
 Stand Up and Fight (1939) - Mob Leader (uncredited)
 Let Freedom Ring (1939) - Gagan
 The Oklahoma Kid (1939) - Indian Jack Pasco
 Overland with Kit Carson (1939) - Mitchell - Trapper
 The Cowboy Quarterback (1939) - The Indian (uncredited)
 Charlie Chan at Treasure Island (1939) - Abdul
 Blackmail (1939) - Southern Deputy (uncredited)
 Gone with the Wind (1939) - Minor Role (uncredited)
 Abe Lincoln in Illinois (1940) - John Hanks
 The Grapes of Wrath (1940) - Jule - Bouncer at Dance (uncredited)
 The Fighting 69th (1940) - First Alabama Man (uncredited)
 Virginia City (1940) - Union Fanatic with Knife (uncredited)
 Dark Command (1940) - Mr. Hale
 Young Buffalo Bill (1940) - Emelio Montez
 Ski Patrol (1940) - Russian Tunnel Team Commander
 Torrid Zone (1940) - Policeman Escorting Lee on Ship (uncredited)
 Island of Doomed Men''' (1940) - District Attorney (uncredited)
 Wagons Westward (1940) - Alan Cook
 New Moon (1940) - Foulette (uncredited)
 Winners of the West (1940, Serial) - Raven
 Three Faces West (1940) - Clem Higgins
 He Stayed for Breakfast (1940) - Police Lieutenant
 The Westerner (1940) - Shad Wilkins
 Girl from Havana (1940) - Drenov, the Russian
 Murder Over New York (1940) - Hindu Businessman (uncredited)
 Santa Fe Trail (1940) - Agitator in Palmyra (uncredited)
 Romance of the Rio Grande (1940) - Henchman Manuel
 Doomed Caravan (1941) - Ed Martin
 Topper Returns (1941) - Rama - the Butler
 The Cowboy and the Blonde (1941) - Wanee, Indian Cook (uncredited)
 Jungle Girl (1941, Serial) - Dr. John Meredith / Bradley Meredith
 Bad Men of Missouri (1941) - Bandaged Soldier (uncredited)
 Highway West (1941) - Husband (uncredited)
 Mystery Ship (1941) - Ernst Madek
 Buy Me That Town (1941) - George
 International Lady (1941) - Krell, the Chemist (uncredited)
 Glamour Boy (1941) - Sheriff
 Red River Valley (1941) - Allison
 Wild Bill Hickok Rides (1942) - Sam Bass
 Henry and Dizzy (1942) - Mr. Weeks
 Flight Lieutenant (1942) - Carey (uncredited)
 The Secret Code (1942, Serial) - Jensen
 Apache Trail (1942) - Amber
 Chetniks! The Fighting Guerrillas (1943) - Peasant Leader (uncredited)
 The Moon Is Down (1943) - Knute Pierson - Foreman (uncredited)
 This Land Is Mine (1943) - Courtroom Guard Who Brings Albert's Notes (uncredited)
 The Chance of a Lifetime (1943) - Manny Vogel (uncredited)
 Deerslayer (1943) - Chief Rivanoak
 None Shall Escape (1944) - Jan Stys as a Man
 The Whistler (1944) - The Bum in the Next Bed (uncredited)
 Tampico (1944) - Charlie - Mexican Waiter (uncredited)
 The Black Parachute (1944) - Nicholas - Guerilla (uncredited)
 U-Boat Prisoner (1944) - Convoy Ship Commander (uncredited)
 The Conspirators (1944) - Stefan (uncredited)
 The Missing Juror (1944) - Tom Pierson (uncredited)
 Faces in the Fog (1944) - Garner, Juror (uncredited)
 Counter-Attack (1945) - Petrov (uncredited)
 Escape in the Desert (1945) - Steve, Citizen Gunman (uncredited)
 A Thousand and One Nights (1945) - Hasson (uncredited)
 Dick Tracy (1945) - Prof. Linwood J. Starling
 God's Country (1946) - White Cloud
 The Hoodlum Saint (1946) - Rabbi Meyerberg
 Dragonwyck (1946) - Farmer (uncredited)
 The Man Who Dared (1946) - Police Sgt. Arthur Landis
 Sing While You Dance (1946) - Dusty
 The Big Sleep (1946) - Art Huck (uncredited)
 Dick Tracy vs. Cueball (1946) - Lester Abbott (uncredited)
 13 Rue Madeleine (1946) - Resistance Fighter (uncredited)
 The Beginning or the End (1947) - Clinic Doctor
 Ramrod (1947) - Bailey - Circle 66 Hand (uncredited)
 The Sea of Grass (1947) - Andy Boggs
 The Millerson Case (1947) - Ward Beechy (uncredited)
 Slave Girl (1947) - Hadji, the Cafe Proprietor
 Wyoming (1947) - Timmons
 Marshal of Cripple Creek (1947) - Tom Lambert
 Unconquered (1947) - Villager Beside Garth at Ft. Pitt Siege (uncredited)
 The Last Round-Up (1947) - Indian Chief (uncredited)
 T-Men (1947) - Rudy (uncredited)
 Tycoon (1947) - Julio Ayora - House Guest (uncredited)
 Alias a Gentleman (1948) - Jig Johnson
 The Wreck of the Hesperus (1948) - William Bliss
 Panhandle (1948) - Barber Customer (uncredited)
 The Mating of Millie (1948) - Mr. Wilson (uncredited)
 The Return of the Whistler (1948) - Arnold (uncredited)
 Adventures in Silverado (1948) - Mike
 Silver River (1948) - Soldier (uncredited)
 The Gallant Legion (1948) - Half-Breed Interpreter (uncredited)
 Secret Service Investigator (1948) - Henry Witzel
 Sword of the Avenger (1948) - Miguel
 Marshal of Amarillo (1948) - Frank Welch
 The Loves of Carmen (1948) - Lucas' Footman (uncredited)
 Behind Locked Doors (1948) - Mr. Purvis - a Patient (uncredited)
 Black Eagle (1948) - Mike Long
 Sundown in Santa Fe (1948) - John Stuart
 Hills of Home (1948) - Saunders (uncredited)
 Smoky Mountain Melody (1948) - Uncle McCorkle
 The Paleface (1948) - Governor's Horseman (uncredited)
 Sheriff of Wichita (1949) - Captain Ira Flanders
 Song of India (1949) - Rewa
 Big Jack (1949) - John Oakes (uncredited)
 The Doolins of Oklahoma (1949) - Ezra Johnson - Farmer (uncredited)
 Hellfire (1949) - Wilson
 The Blazing Trail (1949) - Jess Williams
 Omoo-Omoo, the Shark God (1949) - Capt. Roger Guy
 Lust for Gold (1949) - Man in Saloon (uncredited)
 The Wyoming Bandit (1949) - Wyoming Dan
 San Antone Ambush (1949) - Wade Shattuck
 Apache Chief (1949) - Chief Big Crow
 Bagdad (1949) - Soldier (uncredited)
 Renegades of the Sage (1949) - Miller
 Gun Crazy (1950) - Sheriff Boston
 The Palomino (1950) - Bill Brown (uncredited)
 Cargo to Capetown (1950) - Captain Olferi (uncredited)
 Fortunes of Captain Blood (1950) - Head Prison Guard (uncredited)
 Hills of Oklahoma (1950) - Hank Peters
 Tarzan and the Slave Girl (1950) - Man Building Tomb (uncredited)
 Broken Arrow (1950) - Stage Passenger (uncredited)
 A Lady Without Passport (1950) - Lt. Carfagno, Cuban Cop
 Union Station (1950) - Patrolman (uncredited)
 Copper Canyon (1950) - Southerner Ore Wagon Driver (uncredited)
 Gene Autry and the Mounties (1951) - Raoul Duval
 The Sword of Monte Cristo (1951) - Navarre
 Fort Savage Raiders (1951) - Old Cuss
 Lorna Doone (1951) - Jan Fry (uncredited)
 The Texas Rangers (1951) - 1st Telegraph Operator (uncredited)
 Mask of the Avenger (1951) - Farmer (uncredited)
 Fort Dodge Stampede (1951) - Sparkler McCann
 Honeychile (1951) - Crooked Rancher (uncredited)
 The Barefoot Mailman (1951) - Oat McCarty
 Flight to Mars (1951) - Alzar (uncredited)
 Lone Star (1952) - Sid Yoakum
 Macao (1952) - Alvaris (uncredited)
 The San Francisco Story (1952) - Miner (uncredited)
 Montana Territory (1952) - Lloyd Magruder (uncredited)
 The Man Behind the Gun (1953) - Sheldon's Henchman at Hideout (uncredited)
 The Sun Shines Bright (1953) - Rufe Ramseur
 A Perilous Journey (1953) - Whiskered Miner (uncredited)
 Ambush at Tomahawk Gap (1953) - Twin Forks Sheriff
 The Desert Song (1953) - Neri
 The Man from the Alamo (1953) - Davy Crockett (uncredited)
 Bandits of the West (1953) - Jeff Chadwick
 Thunder Over the Plains (1953) - Walter Morgan (uncredited)
 Red River Shore (1953) - Frank Barlow
 Dangerous Mission (1954) - Kicking Bear Indian Chief at Schoolhouse (uncredited)
 Johnny Guitar (1954) - Jenks (uncredited)
 The Outlaw Stallion (1954) - Rigo
 Destry (1954) - Sheriff Joseph Bailey
 Rage at Dawn (1955) - Fisher
 The Man from Bitter Ridge (1955) - Walter Dunham
 Run for Cover (1955) - Paulsen
 The Man from Bitter Ridge (1955) - Sam Baldwin
 The Rawhide Years (1956) - Captain
 The Rack (1956) - Court President
 Dragoon Wells Massacre (1957) - Marshal Bill Haney
 Shoot-Out at Medicine Bend (1957) - Sheriff Bob Massey
 Man in the Shadow (1957) - Bystander in Opening Scene (uncredited)
 The Monolith Monsters (1957) - Prof. Arthur Flanders
 The Hard Man (1957) - Mitch Willis
 The Restless Gun (1957) - The Marshall in Episode "The Child"
 The Restless Gun (1958) - Enoch Wilson in Episode "Hiram Grover's Strike"
 The Restless Gun (1958) - Episode "Peligroso"
 Thunder Road (1958) - Vernon Doolin
 The Saga of Hemp Brown (1958) - Judge Rawlins
 The Mating Game (1959) - Chief Guthrie
 The Joey Bishop Show (1962, TV Series) - Clem Ames
 Papa's Delicate Condition (1963) - Stanley Henderson II
 The Raiders (1963) - 'Uncle Otto' Strassner
 Mackenna's Gold'' (1969) - Judge Bergerman (uncredited)

References

External links 

 
 Trevor Bardette
 Blockbuster: Trevor Bardette Movies

1902 births
1977 deaths
People from Nashville, Arkansas
Male actors from Arkansas
American male film actors
American male television actors
20th-century American male actors
Oregon State University alumni
People from Green Valley, Arizona